Honey guide may refer to:
 Honeyguides, birds in the family Indicatoridae, of which some species will lead humans to bee colonies.
 Nectar guides, otherwise known as Floral guides; markings that guide pollinators visiting flowers to pollen, nectar, or other incentives.